Baker Township is a township in Gove County, Kansas, USA.  As of the 2000 census, its population was 1,357.

Geography
According to the USGS, it contains three cemeteries: Old Order German Baptist, Quinter and Red Top.

Transportation
Baker Township contains one airport or landing strip, Quinter Air Strip.

References
 USGS Geographic Names Information System (GNIS)

External links
 US-Counties.com
 City-Data.com

Townships in Gove County, Kansas
Townships in Kansas